Cornelius Beach Bradley (November 18, 1843 – February 18, 1936) was an American English-language scholar. He served as professor of rhetoric at the University of California, and also extensively studied the Thai language.

Bradley was born and grew up in Siam, the son of missionary Dan Beach Bradley, and also did missionary work in the country after graduating from Oberlin College in the United States. He returned to the United States in 1874, becoming a teacher and vice-principal at Oakland High School, before joining the faculty of the University of California in 1882. He was also known for mountaineering, especially in the Sierra Nevada.

Bradley was the father of Harold Cornelius Bradley, a professor of biochemistry at UW-Madison, and grandfather of Charles C. Bradley, a professor of geology at Montana State College.

Thai language research

Bradley was a first language speaker of Thai and did some of the earliest linguistic analysis of the language, including studies of its tones, vowels, and writing system.

References

American academics of English literature
Thai studies scholars
Protestant missionaries in Thailand
University of California faculty
Cornelius Beach Bradley
1843 births
1936 deaths
 Oberlin College alumni